The Paul J. Hill School of Business is the undergraduate business school within the Faculty of Business Administration at the University of Regina in Regina, Saskatchewan. The undergraduate school was named for local benefactor Paul J. Hill who donated $10 million to the University. The Faculty of Business Administration's graduate school is known as the Kenneth Levene Graduate School of Business.

Programs
The Paul J. Hill School of Business offers a Bachelor of Business Administration (BBA). The Kenneth Levene Graduate School of Business offers a Master of Business Administration (MBA), a Master of Human Resource Management (MHRM), and a Master of Administration in Leadership.

Notes and references

See also
Higher education in Saskatchewan

Histories of the University
 James Pitsula 'As One Who Serves: The Making Of The University Of Regina' (Montreal:  McGill-Queen's University Press, June 1, 2006)

External links
 Official Website
 Leader-Post story
 
 University of Regina profile with ample photos
 Regina Research Park

Business schools in Canada

Universities and colleges in Saskatchewan